Abolitionism or abolitionist veganism is the animal rights based opposition to all animal use by humans. Abolitionism intends to eliminate all forms of animal use by maintaining that all sentient beings, humans or nonhumans, share a basic right not to be treated as properties or objects. Abolitionist vegans emphasize that the production of animal products requires treating animals as property or resources, and that animal products are not necessary for human health in modern societies. Abolitionists believe that everyone who can live vegan is therefore morally obligated to be vegan.

Abolitionists disagree on the strategy that must be used to achieve their goal. While some abolitionists, like Gary Francione, professor of law, argue that abolitionists should create awareness about the benefits of veganism through creative and nonviolent education (by also pointing to health and environmental benefits) and inform people that veganism is a moral imperative, others such as Tom Regan believe that abolitionists should seek to stop animal exploitation in society, and fight for this goal through political advocacy, without using the environmental or health arguments. 

Abolitionists generally oppose movements that seek to make animal use more humane or to abolish specific forms of animal use, since they believe this undermines the movement to abolish all forms of animal use. The objective is to secure a moral and legal paradigm shift, whereby animals are no longer regarded as things to be owned and used. The American philosopher Tom Regan writes that abolitionists want empty cages, not bigger ones. This is contrasted with animal welfare, which seeks incremental reform, and animal protectionism, which seeks to combine the first principles of abolitionism with an incremental approach, but which is regarded by some abolitionists as another form of welfarism or "New Welfarism".

Concepts

The word relates to the historical term abolitionism—a social movement to end slavery or human ownership of other humans. Based on the way of evaluating welfare reforms, abolitionists can be either radical or pragmatic. While the former maintain that welfare reforms can only be dubiously described as moral improvements, the latter consider welfare reforms as moral improvements even when the conditions they permit are unjust.

Gary Francione, professor of law and philosophy at Rutgers School of Law–Newark, argues from the abolitionist perspective that self-described animal-rights groups who pursue welfare concerns, such as People for the Ethical Treatment of Animals, risk making the public feel comfortable about its use of animals. He calls such groups the "new welfarists", arguing that, though their aim is an end to animal use, the reforms they pursue are indistinguishable from reforms agreeable to traditional welfarists, who he says have no interest in abolishing animal use. He argues that reform campaigns entrench the property status of animals, and validate the view that animals simply need to be treated better. Instead, he writes, the public's view that animals can be used and consumed ought to be challenged. His position is that this should be done by promoting ethical veganism. Others think that this should be done by creating a public debate in society.

New welfarists argue that there is no logical or practical contradiction between abolitionism and "welfarism". Welfarists think that they can be working toward abolition, but by gradual steps, pragmatically taking into account what most people can be realistically persuaded to do in the short as well as the long term, and reduce animal suffering as it is most urgent to relieve. People for the Ethical Treatment of Animals, for example, in addition to promoting local improvements in the treatment of animals, promote vegetarianism. Although some people believe that changing the legal status of nonhuman sentient beings is a first step in abolishing ownership or mistreatment, others may argue that this will fail to succeed if the consuming public has not already begun to reduce or eliminate its exploitation of animals as their own food.

Personhood
In 1992, Switzerland amended its constitution to recognize animals as beings and not things. The dignity of animals is also protected in Switzerland.

New Zealand granted basic rights to five great ape species in 1999. Their use is now forbidden in research, testing or teaching.

In the interests of future generations, Germany added animal welfare in a 2002 amendment to its constitution, becoming the first European Union member to do so.

In 2007, the parliament of the Balearic Islands, an autonomous province of Spain, passed the world's first legislation granting legal rights to all great apes.

In 2013, India officially recognized dolphins as non-human persons.

In 2014, France revised the legal status of animals from movable property to sentient beings, and the province of Quebec in Canada is considering similar legislation.

See also
 Animal liberationist
 Animal rights
 List of animal rights advocates

References

Further reading
Francione, Gary. Rain Without Thunder: The Ideology of the Animal Rights Movement. Temple University Press, 1996.
Francione, Gary and Garner, Robert. The Animal Rights Debate: Abolition Or Regulation?. Columbia University Press, 2010.
Francione, Gary. Ingrid Newkirk on Principled Veganism: "Screw the principle", Animal Rights: The Abolitionist Approach, September 2010.
Francione, Gary. "Animal Rights: The Abolitionist Approach", accessed February 26, 2011.
Francione, Gary. Animals, Property, and the Law. Temple University Press, 1995.
Hall, Lee. "An Interview with Professor Gary L. Francione on the State of the U.S. Animal Rights Movement", Friends of Animals, accessed February 25, 2008.
Regan, Tom. Empty Cages. Rowman & Littlefield Publishers, Inc., 2004.
Regan, Tom. "The Torch of Reason, The Sword of Justice", animalsvoice.com, accessed May 29, 2012.
Regan, Tom. "On Achieving Abolitionist Goals", Animal Rights Zone, May 18, 2011, accessed May 24, 2011.
Regan, Tom. The Case for Animal Rights. University of California Press, 1980.

Animal ethics
Animal rights
Bioethics